Călărași, Calarasi or Calarashi may mean the following:
Călărași, a city in Romania
Călărași County in Romania
Călărași, Moldova, a city in Moldova
Călărași District in Moldova
Călărași, Botoșani, a commune in Botoșani County, Romania
Călărași, Cluj, a commune in Cluj County, Romania
Călărași, Dolj, a commune in Dolj County, Romania
Călărași (cavalry), historical light cavalry in Romanian lands, either military or courier service